Thadeus Wierucki (23 December 1934 – 8 March 2015) was a Belgian professional racing cyclist. He rode in the 1959 and the 1960 Tour de France.

References

External links
 

1934 births
2015 deaths
Belgian male cyclists
Sportspeople from Liège
Cyclists from Liège Province